Alibi for Murder is a 1936 American crime film directed by D. Ross Lederman and starring William Gargan, Marguerite Churchill and Gene Morgan.

Plot
A radio newsman investigates the murder of a well-known inventor.

Cast
 William Gargan as Perry Travis
 Marguerite Churchill as Lois Allen 
 Gene Morgan as Brainy Barker 
 Romaine Callender as E.J. Easton
 Egon Brecher as Sir Conrad Stava
 Drue Leyton as Norma Foster
 Wade Boteler as Police L.t. Conroy
 Dwight Frye as McBride
 Raymond Lawrence as Harkness

References

External links
 

1936 films
1936 crime films
American crime films
American black-and-white films
1930s English-language films
Films directed by D. Ross Lederman
Columbia Pictures films
1930s American films